Objective, Burma! is a 1945 American war film that is loosely based on the six-month raid by Merrill's Marauders in the Burma Campaign during the Second World War. Directed by Raoul Walsh and starring Errol Flynn, the film was made by Warner Bros. immediately after the raid.

Plot

A group of United States Army paratroopers led by Captain Nelson are dropped into Burma to locate and destroy a camouflaged Japanese Army radar station that is detecting Allied aircraft flying into China. For their mission, they are assigned Gurkha guides, a Chinese Army Captain and an older war correspondent whose character is used to explain various procedures to the audience.

The mission is an overwhelming success as the 36-man team quickly take out the station and its personnel. But when the airborne troops arrive at an old airstrip to be taken back to their base, they find the Japanese waiting for them at their rendezvous site. Captain Nelson makes the hard decision to call off the rescue planes, and hike out on foot.

To reduce the likelihood of detection, the group splits into two smaller units and plans to meet up at a deserted Burmese village. But when Nelson arrives at the meeting place, there's no sign of the other group. Eventually, they find a wounded comrade, Hollis, who tells them that the Japanese ambushed the other unit. The remaining soldiers head out on foot and come across an enemy encampment where the captured troops have been held prisoner but discover, to their horror, that they have all been tortured and mutilated. Only Lt. Jacobs remains alive long enough to relate what happened before he himself dies of his injuries. The surviving group is attacked by returning Japanese soldiers and forced to retreat into the jungle. The men must then cross the swamps in their attempt to make it back to safety through the enemy-occupied jungle.

Fighting an almost constant rearguard action, Nelson's paratroopers also succeed as decoys leading Japanese troops away from the site of the British 1944 aerial invasion of Burma.

Cast

Production

Development
Jerry Wald claimed he had the idea for doing a film set in Burma in Christmas 1943, feeling this particular theatre of the war would soon be active, and hoping the movie could be made and released before then.

Lester Cole says the original story was written by Alvah Bessie who wrote a "dozen or so" pages before being pulled off the project by Wald and assigned to something else. The job of writing the story and screenplay was given to Cole and a new writer for film, Ranald MacDougall. MacDougall had been a creator and co-writer of the CBS radio series The Man Behind the Gun that was awarded a 1942 Peabody Award. He had been contracted to Warner Brothers, with this his second film after uncredited work on Pride of the Marines. "Ranald was a pleasure to work with," wrote Cole later, "bright, eager to learn, a facile writer of dialogue: we got along famously."

In his memoirs, Cole claims Wald was inspired by a book about an attempted British invasion of Burma called Merrill's Marauders and he decided to change the troops from being British to American. However, Merrill's Marauders was an American unit.

The film was announced in January 1944, with Wald and Walsh attached. Errol Flynn was already being discussed as the star. Franchot Tone was mentioned as a possible co-star.

Shooting
Filming began in April 1944. By this stage, the Allied campaign had already started in Burma, meaning Wald was unable to do a Casablanca style cashing in on the film's release.

Cole says Walsh had "contempt for writers" but that Wald made him stick to the script.

The film was made with authentic World War II American military material, aircraft and gliders, due to their availability.  Wald acknowledged that the plot bore a significant similarity to the 1940 film Northwest Passage.

Walsh said Flynn "was on his good behaviour because he was writing a book when I was not using him. Between being gung ho and typing his life story he had no time for anything more than a half a dozen drinks, which for him was almost total abstention."

Location
Exteriors were shot at the Los Angeles County Arboretum and Botanic Garden, California. Filming began on May 1, 1944 and was scheduled for 60 days, but shooting required more than 40 extra days due to bad weather and constant script changes.

The movie also contains a large amount of actual combat footage filmed by U.S. Army Signal Corps cameramen in the China-Burma-India theatre as well as New Guinea.

Reception

Critical
The New York Times wrote: "This is without question one of the best war films yet made in Hollywood. There are no phony heroics by Errol Flynn or any of the other members of a uniformly excellent cast. These boys conduct themselves like real soldiers and even the newspaper correspondent is a credit to the craft. The Warners have erred only in the film's excessive length. It runs approximately two hours and twenty minutes, or roughly thirty minutes more than appears to be absolutely necessary."

Variety noted: "The film has considerable movement, particularly in the early reels and the tactics of the paratroopers are authentic in their painstaking detail. However, while the scripters have in the main achieved their purpose of heightening the action, there are scenes in the final reels that could have been edited more closely."

Harrison's Reports wrote: "Very good! It ranks with the best of the war melodramas yet produced ... While the action holds one's interest all the way through, a cut of ten to fifteen minutes in the running time would not affect its dramatic punch." Film Daily wrote: "The picture impresses with its air of authenticity and the vivid realism that has gone into the telling of its story, and it possesses almost unremitting action crowded with the starkest of drama ... The primary fault of the film is that it is dragged out beyond all reason. There is much repetitious material that could be cut out to the improvement of the film."

Filmink magazine called the film "serious, hard and lacks any sort of female interest – the enemy are ruthless and clever and the soldiers still wisecrack, but they are professional, no-nonsense killers who follow orders and get along with each other (unless really stressed) i.e. there is no contrived in-fighting."

Box Office
According to Warner Bros records, Objective, Burma! earned $2,117,000 domestically and $1,844,000 foreign. It was the studio's sixth most popular film of the year, after Hollywood Canteen, To Have and Have Not, Arsenic and Old Lace, God Is My Co-Pilot and Christmas in Connecticut. The film was also one of the most popular movies of 1945 in France, with over 2.6 million admissions.

Controversies
Even though it was based on the exploits of Merrill's Marauders, Objective Burma was withdrawn from release in the United Kingdom after it infuriated the British public. Prime Minister Winston Churchill protested the Americanization of the huge and almost entirely British, Indian, and Commonwealth conflict ('1 million men').

Objective, Burma! London 1945 premiere was remarkable: At a line in the script, (by an American, to the effect) "We should head north, I hear there might be a few brits somewhere over there" - The entire (English) audience walked out in outrage. It got a second release in the United Kingdom in 1952 when it was shown with an accompanying apology. The movie was also banned in Singapore although it was seen in Burma and India.

An editorial in The Times said: It is essential both for the enemy and the Allies to understand how it came about that the war was won ... nations should know and appreciate the efforts other countries than their own made to the common cause.

There were also objections to Errol Flynn playing the hero as he had stayed in Hollywood during the war, unlike actors like David Niven or James Stewart. Flynn, however, had actually tried to enlist but had been declared medically unfit for military service. His studio suppressed the news of his medical problems to preserve his public image.

Nominations
The film was nominated for three Academy Awards in 1945:
 Film Editing – George Amy
 Original Music Score – Franz Waxman
 Best Story – Alvah Bessie

Cole felt that Bessie did not deserve his credit on the film for story, saying he only contributed some pages, and felt he and MacDougall should have had it. However, he decided not to challenge the credit because Bessie was a friend. Cole was disappointed however when Bessie went on to earn an Oscar nomination.

References

Notes

Bibliography

External links

 
 
 
 
Downloadable trailer in different formats

1940s war films
1945 films
American black-and-white films
American war films
Burma Campaign films
1940s English-language films
Films scored by Franz Waxman
Films directed by Raoul Walsh
Films produced by Jerry Wald
Films set in Myanmar
Films shot in California
Films with screenplays by Ranald MacDougall
Warner Bros. films
World War II aviation films
World War II films made in wartime